Nebulosa elicioi is a moth of the family Notodontidae first described by James S. Miller in 2008. It is endemic
to the eastern slope of the Ecuadorian Andes.

The length of the forewings is 12.5–14 mm for males and 13–14 mm for females. The ground color of the forewings is brown to gray brown. The central area and anterior margin of the hindwings are translucent white.

The larvae feed on Casearia arboreum and Siparuna lepidota.

Etymology
The species is named in honor of Elicio Tapia, from Quito, Ecuador.

References

Moths described in 2008
Notodontidae of South America